Rai Sahib / Rao Saheb / Roy Sahib / Rao Sahib abbreviated R.S., was a title of honour issued during the era of British rule in India to individuals who performed faithful service or acts of public welfare to the nation. From 1911 the title was accompanied by a special Title Badge. Translated, Rai means "King" sahib means "leader".

This was the start level title usually awarded to civilians, which could later be upgraded to Rao Bahadur and then to Dewan Bahadur titles.

The title styled Rai Sahib were awarded to Hindu people of North India, Rao Saheb in Maharashtra and styled Rao Sahib to Hindu people of South India, however, they were both of same category and spelling was altered to meet with regional differences of pronunciation.

The Rai Sahib/Rao Sahib/Roy Sahib and other similar titles issued during British Raj were disestablished in 1947 upon independence of India.

Some people awarded the title 

 Rao Bahadur Satyendra Nath Mukherjee, Awarded Rai Saheb on 4 June 1934. He was the first Indian Origin Deputy Commissioner of Police, Calcutta.
Rao Sahib Ayyathan Gopalan (Kerala, India) a.k.a. "Darsarji" – Doctor, chief surgeon, hospital superintendent and in charges, medical school professor and also served as the magistrate of Malabar region of Kerala (during British rule in India), social reformer of Kerala. -awarded Raisahib on 17 November 1917 by British Government. 
Pandit Wazir Chand Trikha, Jhang, Pakistan (India) – Chief Accounts officer northern railways.
Nagendra Kumar Bhattacharyya – Commissioner of Berhampore 1932–1948, Murshidabad District, West Bengal
Ramnath Goenka, Bombay – newspaper editor and businessman
Mulji Jagmal Sawaria, Bilaspur, Chhattisgarh – miner
A. Y. S. Parisutha Nadar, Thanjavur – Politician, Industrialist
Abraham Pandithar –  Tamil musicologist, composer and a traditional medicine practitioner (2 August 1859 – 31 August 1919) 
Dinanath Atmaram Dalvi (1844–1897) SubJudge, later Subordinate Judge Bombay Presidency, Senior Dakshina Fellow Elphinstone College Bombay, Fellow Bombay University and Author of the book "An Examination of Sir Isaac Newton's Rule for finding the Number of Imaginary Square Roots in an Equation".
Dukhan Ram – Indian ophthalmologist, legislator and Padma Bhushan recipient
Mahabir Prasad Misra – Educator, Madhubani District, Dharbanga.
Gidugu Venkata Ramamurthy – Telugu linguist
Ganpatrao Narayanrao Madiman – Noted businessman and banker from Hubli, Karnataka.
Kashinath Krishna Kalkar – Dy Collector of Amalner
Koovarji Karsan Rathor – industrialist from Cuttack
Kuppusamy Kodandapani Pillai – Deputy Collector, Protector of Emigrants, Special Officer for South African Repatriates and Controller of Emigration from Madras
Harilal Shamji – philanthropist and industrialist from Raigarh

See also

Rao Bahadur
Dewan Bahadur
Raj Ratna
Title Badge (India)

References

External links

Image of Indian Title Badge, George V, first variety, 3rd class

Rai Sahibs
Titles in India
Titles in Bangladesh
Titles in Pakistan
Orders, decorations, and medals of British India
Men's social titles
Orders, decorations, and medals of India
Awards disestablished in 1947